Onemana is a 1970s beach village on the eastern side of the Coromandel Peninsula of New Zealand, with a beach, a surf club, fire station and dairy. The Wharekawa River and Opoutere are just to the north and west.

History 

The area was originally named Whitipirorua by Māori. The first known settlers of the area were the Ngāti Hei. They were supplanted by Ngāti Hako in the mid 17th century, but Ngā Puhi raids during the Musket Wars of the early 19th century left the area without a permanent population. By a variety of means the land was acquired by the government and sold to settlers. Archaeological evidence suggests that the area was first settled in the 1300s, with a pā located at the south of Onemana Beach. The area was important for the production of stone tools made of matā (chert) and matā tūhua (obsidian).

The 364 section subdivision was created in the 1970s on the Bambury family's Shang-ri-la farm. Much of the archaeological site was destroyed to make way for the subdivision. The name Onemana was adopted for the subdivision, however the name has no traditional relationship with the area.

Demographics 
Onemana is described by Statistics New Zealand as a rural settlement. Onemana is part of the larger Whangamatā Rural statistical area.

Onemana had a population of 153 at the 2018 New Zealand census, an increase of 42 people (37.8%) since the 2013 census, and an increase of 24 people (18.6%) since the 2006 census. There were 84 households, comprising 72 males and 81 females, giving a sex ratio of 0.89 males per female. The median age was 63.1 years (compared with 37.4 years nationally), with 18 people (11.8%) aged under 15 years, 9 (5.9%) aged 15 to 29, 57 (37.3%) aged 30 to 64, and 69 (45.1%) aged 65 or older.

Ethnicities were 92.2% European/Pākehā, 17.6% Māori, and 2.0% Pacific peoples. People may identify with more than one ethnicity.

Although some people chose not to answer the census's question about religious affiliation, 54.9% had no religion, and 37.3% were Christian.

Of those at least 15 years old, 30 (22.2%) people had a bachelor's or higher degree, and 24 (17.8%) people had no formal qualifications. The median income was $30,000, compared with $31,800 nationally. 18 people (13.3%) earned over $70,000 compared to 17.2% nationally. The employment status of those at least 15 was that 39 (28.9%) people were employed full-time, 18 (13.3%) were part-time, and 3 (2.2%) were unemployed.

The population can approach 3,000 during the summer peak.

Infrastructure 
The sewage plant handles up to  a day, which is disposed of to landfill. Heavy overnight rain from Cyclone Wilma in March 2017 damaged 2 houses with slips and caused wastewater overflows. Onemana sewage plant resource consent renewal was scheduled for 2019/2020. Two accessible toilets, a shelter and community notice board were funded by the Tourism Infrastructure Fund in 2019.

Surfing 
Onemana has several surfing peaks along the beach with both right and left handed breaks. The seabed is a mix of sand and rocky reef; and a stream discharges centrally to the bay. A right hand break is sometimes off the southern point through to the beach.

Notes 

Thames-Coromandel District
Populated places in Waikato